Physalaemus signifer is a species of frog in the family Leptodactylidae.
It is endemic to Brazil.
Its natural habitats are subtropical or tropical moist lowland forests, dry savanna, freshwater marshes, and intermittent freshwater marshes.
It is threatened by habitat loss.

References

signifer
Endemic fauna of Brazil
Taxonomy articles created by Polbot
Amphibians described in 1853